Vujadin (Cyrillic script: Вујадин) is a traditional Serbian given name, and may refer to:

Vujadin Boškov
Vujadin Stanojković
Vujadin Vujadinović
Vujadin Savić

See also
Vujadinović

Slavic masculine given names
Serbian masculine given names